Fox Township, Pennsylvania may refer to:

 Fox Township, Elk County, Pennsylvania
 Fox Township, Sullivan County, Pennsylvania

See also 
 Fox Township (disambiguation)

Pennsylvania township disambiguation pages